San Giovanni sotto le Penne is a small village (curazia) in central San Marino. It belongs to the castle of Borgo Maggiore.

Geography
It is located south of the country's highest point Monte Titano, on a road bordering to the territory of the city of San Marino. It includes the archaeological site of Maiano.

Sport
The local football team is the San Giovanni.

Curazie in San Marino
Borgo Maggiore